Better known for its high school basketball, Indiana high school football has also been a staple of Hoosier weekends for more than 100 years. In 1930, more than 30,000 people jammed Notre Dame Stadium to watch Mishawaka beat undefeated South Bend Central, 6-0. At the time, it was one of the largest crowds to witness a high school football game in the United States. Indiana high school football is still immensely popular, with tens of thousands now packing Lucas Oil Stadium in Indianapolis to watch six state championship games over two days in November. The following is a history of Indiana's big school state football championship.

1920-1936: The North and mythical state champions 
From the late 1800s through 1919, Indiana high school football teams  often played fewer than five games per year and many times skipped entire seasons. Pre-1920 games often featured high school teams playing semi-pro club teams, college teams, and even intramural scrimmages. Various teams made state championship claims, but most were unfounded until organized leagues and verified games became commonplace beginning with the 1920 season. By that year, as many as 26 high schools in northern Indiana — stretching from Fort Wayne to East Chicago — were annually compiling standings and functioning as the state’s first organized football conference. These northern football teams frequently defeated powerhouse teams from other states and were rarely defeated by Indiana teams from outside the league. For example, From 1921 to 1926, Gary Emerson never lost a game to an in-state team. The winner of this early super conference usually claimed the "mythical" state football championship prior to 1928.  Indeed, when an Indiana mythical state championship game was played between the best teams of northern and southern Indiana (in 1923, 1924, 1927, 1929, and 1930) the northern league champion won every time.

In 1926, for one year, the league standings included power teams from around the state, including Evansville Central, Richmond, Indianapolis Tech, Marion, and Muncie, all of whom finished behind league leaders Mishawaka and Gary Emerson. In 1927, many of these same northern teams – from Elkhart to East Chicago – officially formed the Northern Indiana Conference (NIC), with its champion going on to dominate the #1 final ranking in the AP and UPI polls well into the 1960s.

By the early 1930s, the Evansville and Terre Haute areas were also well established as Indiana high school football hotbeds. Clinton (north of Terre Haute) won three titles between 1928 and 1933, and Evansville Memorial, best in the south in 1937, defeated McKeesport, champions of Western Pennsylvania, 21-0, in what some newspapers called the mythical national championship.

The following teams were widely considered the state football champions: Schools in italics are now consolidated or defunct.

 1920 - Wabash4 and Mishawaka1
 1921 - Gary Emerson1 and Gary Froebel1
 1922 - Gary Emerson1 (2)
 1923 - Gary Emerson² (3)
 1924 - Elkhart (Central)²
 1925 - Mishawaka1,4 (2)
 1926 - Mishawaka1 (3)
 1927 - Gary Froebel² (2)
 1928 - Clinton³
 1929 - Gary Mann²,³
 1930 - Gary Emerson²,³ (4)
 1931 - South Bend Central4
 1932 - Clinton³ (2)
 1933 - Clinton²,³ (3)
 1934 - South Bend Central1,4 (2) and Terre Haute Garfield4
 1935 - Evansville Memorial²,³
 1936 - Gary Mann5 (2)
1 NIC Champion

2 Winner of arranged post-season North-South Mythical State Championship Game
 1923 - Gary Emerson 7, Muncie Central 0
 1924 - Elkhart (Central) 28, Bicknell 6
 1927 - Gary Froebel 70, Indianapolis Shortridge 0
 1929 - Gary Mann 38, Fort Wayne Central 0
 1930 - Gary Emerson 21, Logansport 7
 1933 - Clinton 6, East Chicago Washington 6, tie
 1935 - Evansville Memorial 13, Fort Wayne Central 0
3 Winner of Indianapolis Times & IHSAA ‘Most Outstanding Team in Indiana’ Trophy – 1927, 1928, 1929, 1930, 1932, 1933, and 1935

4 Mythical State Champions named by “various Indiana newspapers,” according to AlmanacSports.com – 1920, 1925, 1931 and 1934

5 NIC East-West Playoff Champion - 1936 (no other claims found)

( ) Total State Championships

1937-1972: The polls rule 
The AP and UP(I) Polls awarded Mythical State Football Championships from 1937 to 1972. Many schools went on to play postseason games after the final polls were released and some schools subsequently disputed these AP/UPI mythical championships.

 1937 - Hammond
 1938 - Evansville Memorial (2)
 1939 - South Bend Washington
 1940 - Fort Wayne North
 1941 - Gary Wallace
 1942 - East Chicago Washington (2)
 1943 - South Bend Washington (2)
 1944 - Muncie Central
 1945 - East Chicago Roosevelt
 1946 - East Chicago Roosevelt (2)
 1947 - East Chicago Roosevelt (3)
 1948 - Evansville Reitz
 1949 - East Chicago Roosevelt (4)
 1950 - Lafayette Jefferson
 1951 - Hammond Bishop Noll*
 1952 - Richmond
 1953 - South Bend Washington (3)
 1954 - Whiting
 1955 - East Chicago Roosevelt (5)
 1956 - Richmond (2)
 1957 - Evansville Reitz (2) & East Chicago Roosevelt (6)
 1958 - South Bend Central (3)
 1959 - South Bend Central (4)
 1960 - Evansville Reitz (3) & Hammond (2)
 1961 - Evansville Reitz (4)
 1962 - Hammond (3)
 1963 - Elkhart (Central) (2)
 1964 - South Bend St. Joseph*
 1965 - Hammond Morton
 1966 - Indianapolis Washington
 1967 - Richmond (3)
 1968 - Bloomington (South) & Elkhart (Central) (3)
 1969 - South Bend Washington (4)
 1970 - Elkhart (Central) (4)
 1971 - Evansville Reitz (5)*
 1972 - Bloomington South (2)
( ) Total State Championships

* Evansville Reitz also went on to win a 4A smaller school state championships in 2007 and 2009, as did South Bend St. Joseph (3A) in 1995, and Hammond Bishop Noll (3A) in 1989. See Indiana High School Football Champions - Smaller Schools.

1973-present: Settling it on the field - the rise of Indianapolis football 
IHSAA State Tournament Champions. Over the years the largest enrollment classification has moved from 3A, to 4A, to 5A, and now to 6A. For a listing of smaller school state champions see Indiana High School Football Champions - Smaller Schools.

 1973 - South Bend Washington (5)
 1974 - Indianapolis Washington (2)
 1975 - Valparaiso
 1976 - Merrillville
 1977 - Portage
 1978 - Carmel
 1979 - Columbus East
 1980 - Carmel (2)
 1981 - Carmel (3)
 1982 - (Evansville) Castle
 1983 - (Mishawaka) Penn
 1984 - Indianapolis Warren Central
 1985 - Indianapolis Warren Central (2)
 1986 - Carmel (4)
 1987 - Indianapolis Ben Davis
 1988 - Indianapolis Ben Davis (2)
 1989 - Carmel (5)
 1990 - Indianapolis Ben Davis (3)
 1991 - Indianapolis Ben Davis (4)
 1992 - Fort Wayne Snider
 1993 - Bloomington South (3)
 1994 - (Evansville) Castle (2)
 1995 - (Mishawaka) Penn (2)
 1996 - (Mishawaka) Penn (3)
 1997 - (Mishawaka) Penn (4)
 1998 - Bloomington South (4)
 1999 - Indianapolis Ben Davis (5)
 2000 - (Mishawaka) Penn (5)
 2001 - Indianapolis Ben Davis (6)
 2002 - Indianapolis Ben Davis (7)
 2003 - Indianapolis Warren Central (3)
 2004 - Indianapolis Warren Central (4)
 2005 - Indianapolis Warren Central (5)
 2006 - Indianapolis Warren Central (6)
 2007 - Carmel (6)
 2008 - Center Grove
 2009 - Warren Central (7)
 2010 - Fishers
 2011 - Carmel (7)
 2012 - Indianapolis Lawrence Central
 2013 - Indianapolis Warren Central (8)
 2014 - Indianapolis Ben Davis (8) 
 2015 - Center Grove (2)
 2016 - Carmel (8)
 2017 - Indianapolis Ben Davis (9)
 2018 - Indianapolis Warren Central (9)
 2019 - Carmel (9)
 2020 - Center Grove (3)
 2021 - Center Grove (4)
 2022 - Center Grove (5)

( ) Total State Championships

Big school state championships by school 

 1. Ben Davis - 9
 1. Warren Central - 9
 1. Carmel - 9
 4. East Chicago Roosevelt - 6
 5. Penn - 5
 5. South Bend Washington - 5
 5. Evansville Reitz - 5
 5. Center Grove - 5
 9. Bloomington South - 4
 9. Elkhart Central - 4
 9. South Bend Central - 4
 9. Gary Emerson - 4
 13. Richmond - 3
 13. Mishawaka - 3
 13. Clinton - 3
 16. (Evansville) Castle - 2
 16. Fort Wayne Snider - 2
 16. Indianapolis Washington - 2
 16. Hammond - 2
 16. Evansville Memorial - 2
 16. Gary Mann - 2
 16. Gary Froebel - 2
 23. Lawrence Central - 1
 23. Fishers - 1
 23. Columbus East - 3
 23. Portage - 1
 23. Merrillville - 1
 23. Valparaiso - 1
 23. Hammond Morton - 1
 23. South Bend St. Joseph's - 1
 23. Whiting - 1
 23. Hammond Noll - 1
 23. Lafayette Jefferson - 1
 23. Muncie Central - 1
 23. Gary Wallace - 1
 23. Fort Wayne Dwenger - 1
 23. Fort Wayne North - 1
 23. Terre Haute Garfield - 1
 23. Wabash - 1

Big school state championships by region 

 Indianapolis Metro - 36
 Northwest Indiana: The Region - 24
 South Bend/Mishawaka/Elkhart - 22
 Evansville - 9
 Bloomington - 4
 Fort Wayne - 4
 Terre Haute/Clinton - 4
 Richmond - 3
 Other - 3

See also 

 Indiana High School Football Champions - Smaller Schools
 Indiana High School Boys Basketball Champions

High school football in Indiana